The Roman Catholic Diocese of Brechin, also known as the Diocese of Angus, was one of the thirteen pre-Reformation dioceses of Scotland.

History 
The diocese was believed to have been founded by Bishop Samson in 1153, and based at the cathedral in Brechin, Angus.
 
At the Reformation, the cathedral, churches and jurisdiction of the diocese were transferred to the Church of Scotland, its line of episcopacy having been continued without breaks by the Scottish Episcopal Church, which separated from the Church of Scotland in 1690. 

The Diocese has been led by the Bishop of Brechin (Episcopal), sole successor to the early Catholic Bishop of Brechin.

Parishes 
 Brechin (Cathedral)
 Buthergill (now Burghill)
 Catterline
 Cortachy
 Crebyauch (now Kirkbuddo)
 Dun
 Dundee
 Dunnichen
 Farnell
 Fothenevyn (now Finavon or Oathlaw)
 Glenbervie
 Glenisla
 Guthrie
 Kilmoir
 Kingornie
 Kingoldrum
 Lethnot
 Maryton
 Menmuir
 Monikie
 Montrose
 Navar
 Panbride
 Stracathro
 Strathmartine

and in the Mearns
 Garvock
 Strachan

References 

Christianity in Dundee
Christianity in Angus, Scotland
Pre-Reformation dioceses of Scotland
Religious organizations established in the 1150s
Dioceses established in the 12th century
Brechin
1153 establishments in Scotland
Diocese